Bar or BAR may refer to:

Food and drink 
 Bar (establishment), selling alcoholic beverages
 Candy bar
 Chocolate bar

Science and technology
 Bar (river morphology), a deposit of sediment
 Bar (tropical cyclone), a layer of cloud
 Bar (unit), a unit of pressure
 BAR domain, a protein domain
 Bar stock, of metal
 Sandbar

Computing
 Bar (computer science), a placeholder
 Base Address Register in PCI
 Bar, a mobile phone form factor
 Bar, a type of graphical control element

Law
 Bar (law), the legal profession
 Bar association
 Bar examination

Media and entertainment
 Bar (Croatian TV series)
 Bar (Czech TV series)
 Bar (dance), Turkey
 Bar (music), a segment
 Bar (Polish TV series)
 Bar (Slovenian TV series)
 Bay Area Reporter, a newspaper
 Biblical Archaeology Review, a magazine
 "Bar" (song), by Tini and L-Gante

Places
 Bar (Martian crater)
 Bar, Rutog County, Tibet, China
 Bar (river), France
 Bar, Corrèze, France, a commune
 Bar-le-Duc, France, a commune formerly Bar, Meuse
 Bar-sur-Aube, France, a commune
 Bar-sur-Seine, France, a commune
 Bár, Hungary, a village
 Bar, Bushehr, Iran, a village
 Bar, Hormozgan, Iran, a village
 Bar, Razavi Khorasan, Iran, a city
 Bar Municipality, Montenegro
 Bar, Montenegro, a town
 Bar Region, Punjab, Pakistan
 Bar, Republic of Buryatia, Russia
 Bar, Vinnytsia Oblast, Ukraine, a town
 Duchy of Bar, part of the Holy Roman Empire
 Barbados, IOC and UNDP country code BAR

Language
 Bar (diacritic), a line through a letter
 Bavarian language (ISO 639-3: bar)
 Vertical bar, a punctuation symbol
 X-bar theory, in linguistics

Transportation
 Bangor and Aroostook Railroad, US, reporting mark
 Barstow station, US, station code
 California Bureau of Automotive Repair, a consumer protection agency
 Qionghai Bo'ao Airport, IATA code

Firearms
 M1918 Browning Automatic Rifle
 Browning BAR, a Belgian rifle

Other uses
 Bar (Aramaic), a patronymic prefix in Aramaic
 Bar (heraldry), a band across a shield
 Bar (name)
 Bar Confederation, an 18th-century Polish association
 Bar Mitzvah, a Jewish coming of age ceremony, with "bar" meaning son in Jewish Babylonian Aramaic ("ben" in Hebrew)
 Blaauwberg Armoured Regiment, South African Army
 British Archaeological Reports
 British American Racing, a Formula One constructor
 Chin-up bar, playground equipment
 Medal bar, additional award
 Space bar, on a keyboard
 Historical gatehouse
 Bennett acceptance ratio in thermodynamics
 BlackArts Racing Team, a motor racing team from Hong Kong

See also
 The Bar (disambiguation)
 Barr (disambiguation)
 Barre (disambiguation)
 Bars (disambiguation)
 Bär (disambiguation)
 FUBAR